Fuamatu is a surname. Notable people with the surname include:

Emanuele Fuamatu (born 1989), Samoan athlete
Fila Fuamatu, Samoan powerlifter

See also
Chris Fuamatu-Maʻafala (born 1977), American football player

Samoan-language surnames